The Leogang Mountains (lit. "Leogang Rock Mountains") are a mountain range in Austria in the state of Salzburg and form part of the Northern Limestone Alps within the Eastern Alps. They are located between the Lofer valley, Saalfelden and Leogang and, together with the Lofer Mountains to the northwest form two mountain massifs that are separated by the saddle of the Römersattel (1,202 m), but which the Alpine categorisation of the Eastern Alps defines as a single sub-group (the Lofer and Leogang Mountains). The Leogang Mountains are separated from the Kitzbühel Alps to the south and the Steinernes Meer to the east by deeply incised valleys. Typical of the Steinberge are high plateaux with steep sides and sharply undulating high cirques.

As typical karst mountains the Leogang Mountains are also pierced by numerous caves. The most famous of these is the Lamprechtsofen, over 50 km long, located immediately next to the federal road between Lofer and Saalfelden. A prominent rock formation is the Melkerloch in the southeastern face of the Birnhorn mountain.

At  the Birnhorn is the highest peak in the range. The Hochfilzen Military Training Area used by the Austrian Army lies in the west of the Leoganger Steinberge.

Neighbouring ranges 
The Leogang Mountains border on the following mountain groups in the Alps:
 Lofer Mountains to the northwest
 Berchtesgaden Alps to the east
 Salzburg Slate Alps to the southeast
 Kitzbühel Alps to the south
 Kaiser Mountains to the west

Peaks 

 Birnhorn: 
 Kuchelhorn: 
 Passauerkopf: 
 Grießener Hochbrett: 
 Signalkopf: 
 Großes Rothorn: 
 Dürrkarhorn: 
 Hochzint: 
 Mitterhorn: 
 Fahnenköpfl: 
 Brandhorn:

Tourism

Alpine Club huts 

In the Leogang Mountains there are only two mountain huts.  They  belong to the DAV - Deutscher Alpenverein - German Alpine Club but are operated by local Austrians.  The DAV operates a Recripical Rights system so that OEVA - Austrian Alpine Club member discounts, were applicable, can be enjoyed.

 Lamprechtsofen-Höhlengaststätte: Height: , only opened during the day in summer and winter, 6 mattress bunks, next to the Bundesstraße from Lofer to Saalfelden
 Passauer Hut: Height: , open in summer from mid-June to end of September, 45 mattress bunks, winter accommodation with 6 bedspaces, Valley destinations: Leogang, walking time: 2.75 hours.

Mountain huts 
 Lettlkaser: height: , open in summer, no winter accommodation, no bedspaces, Valley destinations: Pernerwinkel-Gerstboden (2h walk), Wiesersberg-Gerstboden (2.5h walk), Leogang (2h walk), Mitterbrand (1.5h walk)

References

External links

 
Mountain ranges of the Alps
Northern Limestone Alps
Mountain ranges of Salzburg (state)
Mountain ranges of Tyrol (state)